Craig Allen Grebeck (born December 29, 1964) is an American former professional baseball middle infielder. He played in Major League Baseball (MLB) for the Chicago White Sox, Florida Marlins, Anaheim Angels, Toronto Blue Jays, and Boston Red Sox.

In 1989, Grebeck led the Southern League with 153 base hits.

Grebeck was mainly used as a backup in his career. Known for not wearing batting gloves, he hit .261, 19 home runs, 187 RBIs, and 518 hits in 752 major league games. Grebeck hit his first major league home run off of Hall of Famer Nolan Ryan, who then proceeded to plunk Grebeck in his ribs the following week, breaking a rib.

Grebeck was nicknamed 'The Little Hurt to our offense' by White Sox announcer Ken Harrelson.

References

External links

1964 births
Living people
American expatriate baseball players in Canada
Anaheim Angels players
Baseball players from Pennsylvania
Birmingham Barons players
Boston Red Sox players
Cal State Dominguez Hills Toros baseball players
Chicago White Sox players
Florida Marlins players
Major League Baseball second basemen
Nashville Sounds players
Peninsula White Sox players
Sportspeople from Johnstown, Pennsylvania
Syracuse SkyChiefs players
Toronto Blue Jays players
Vancouver Canadians players